, is a Japanese jazz fusion drummer who combines electronic drum technology and acoustic drums. Aside from his solo work, he was the drummer for the Japanese jazz fusion band Casiopea in 3 separate stints (1980-1989, 1997-2006 and 2012-2022) and had participated in side projects with Keiko Matsui, Shambara, and Brian Bromberg.

Background
Akira Jimbo began drumming at the age of 18 when he joined the Keio University Light Music Society Big Band. He became a member of Casiopea in 1980. During his solo career, he formed Jimsaku-duo with Casiopea's bassist Tetsuo Sakurai in 1989. He has also worked with Hiroyuki Noritake from T-Square in the drum-duo Synchronized DNA.

Jimbo has a drumming style which is best demonstrated in his drum videos and at his drum clinics. By using the DTX drum triggering system, he is able to play a full band sound without a backing track. Jimbo has assisted in the design of K Custom Hybrid Series of cymbals by Zildjian. His drum hero is Steve Gadd.

In 1999, he won second place in the British drum magazine RHYTHM for most popular drummer. In June 2000, he became the first Asian drummer to be featured on the cover of Modern Drummer magazine. He appeared in the Modern Drummers Festival in 2000.

Drum setup

One unique aspect of Jimbo's drumming is the setup of his drums.  Using acoustic drums together with Yamaha electronic drum triggers, Jimbo is able to create a live performance with an array of different sounds.
Apart from endorsing Yamaha drums and Zildjian cymbals, he also endorses Vic Firth drumsticks.

MIDI Drum Trigger System
He claims every sound is triggered as a live performance by himself, which is true in the past as the limitation of the trigger system during that time.
As his career progress, in fact, now he did use many sequencing programs during some portions such as in intense drum solo part or some difficult arrangements.

Main Drum Kit Setup
Acoustic Drums
 Yamaha WSD13AJ (13"×7") Beech Custom Akira Jimbo Signature Snare Drum
 Yamaha YD9000AJ (8",10",12",14",16",22") Recording Custom Akira Jimbo debut 30th Anniversary Kit

Cymbals
 Zildjian K Custom Hybrid Series
 13.25" Hi-Hat
 17" Crash
 19" Trash Smash
 19" China
 21" Ride
 9" Splash
 13" Trash Splash/15" Trash Crash (stack)

Electronic Drum Trigger
 Yamaha DTX900

Past Equipments
Drum Sets
1980 – YD9000R
1990 – Yamaha Rock Tour Custom
1992 – Maple Custom
1995 – Yamaha Rock Tour Custom
1997 – Beech Custom
2001 – Beech Custom Absolute
2004 – Oak Custom Absolute
2005 – Oak Custom Akira Jimbo 25th anniversary
2010 – YD9000AJ Akira Jimbo 30th anniversary

Signature Snare Drums
1992 – MSD13AJ Maple 7ply Power Hoop (Limited)
1997 – WSD13AJ Beech 8ply Wood Hoop
2004 – NSD13AJ Oak 6ply Wood Hoop (Limited)
2012 – BSD1450AJ Old Birch 6ply Steel Hoop (Limited)

Discography

Studio Albums - Solo

Covers Albums

Collaborations

Compilations

Unit albums

Drums Lesson Series

References

External links
 Official site in Japanese
 Akira Jimbo Interview NAMM Oral History Library (2008)

1959 births
Living people
Japanese drummers
Japanese jazz musicians
Optimism Records artists
Casiopea members